Albert Eugene Kahn (May 11, 1912 – September 15, 1979) was an American journalist, photographer, and author. He is known chiefly for his books Sabotage! The Secret War Against America (1944), related to Nazi and German-American subversive activities in the United States; and The Great Conspiracy: The Secret War Against Soviet Russia (1946). The latter described leading Soviet communists as foreign spies, based on their confessions at the Moscow Trials.

For a time during the 1930s, Kahn had been a member of the Communist Party in the United States, but had changed his thinking by the 1940s and opposed it and the Cold War. In the late 1940s he was blacklisted and unable to gain publication by a mainstream publisher until 1962. In the early 1950s, he and Angus Cameron, an editor formerly with Little, Brown who had also been blacklisted, founded Cameron & Kahn publishers.

Albert E. Kahn's father, Moritz Kahn, was a senior engineer in Albert Kahn Associates, and worked with his two brothers there, Albert Kahn and inventor Julius Kahn.

Early life and education
Kahn was born in London, England in 1912 to an affluent, politically conservative Jewish family. His father Moritz was one of three brothers and became an engineer. His brothers were Albert Kahn, who became known in the United States and internationally as an industrial architect, and inventor Julius Kahn. Albert Kahn founded Albert Kahn Associates in Detroit, Michigan, in which his brothers were associates. Albert Kahn Associates established an office in Moscow in 1930 to train and supervise Soviet architects and engineers, and to design industrial facilities. Moritz Kahn had the lead to set up the Kahn brothers' Soviet Union operation in the early 1930s as a collaboration with Gosproekstroi, the Soviet office for industry.

Educated in the United States, Kahn attended Phillips Exeter Academy and Dartmouth College, where he was a star athlete.  His education included Shakespeare. Later in life he said that the study of King Lear first awakened in him a sense of injustice. He was Dartmouth Class Poet, graduating in 1932.

Married in 1934, he and the former Harriet Warner moved to California. Their children included writer Brian Kahn. There Kahn tried unsuccessfully to become a Hollywood screenwriter.

Political leanings
Kahn developed an interest in socialism and working for social justice. After the outbreak of the Spanish Civil War in 1937, Kahn agreed to lead an "ambulance tour", to raise medical relief funds for Loyalist forces fighting against the fascist-supported Franco rebellion. On the tour, Kahn spoke to audiences ranging from the wealthy to the unemployed. It was the height of the Depression and Kahn was deeply affected by the widespread deprivation that he saw.

Communists and socialists organized many of the speaking events and impressed Kahn with their idealism. After completing the tour in 1938, he joined the Communist Party of the United States, as did many left-leaning artists, writers and other intellectuals in those years.

With no employment prospects, Kahn accepted a job at his uncle's architectural firm, Albert Kahn Associates, where his father Moritz Kahn was a senior engineer. His father had led establishing an office of the firm in Moscow, beginning in 1930, which trained Soviet and other architects and engineers in industrial design and construction, supporting the country's industrialization under its first five-year plan.

Kahn's political activism quickly caused a rupture with his uncle's firm. A talented orator, Kahn had begun giving anti-fascist speeches. Because he had the same name as his prominent uncle, internationally regarded for his industrial architecture, the publicity caused consternation at the firm.

His uncle and father were concerned also because industrialist Henry Ford was the company's largest client, and he was engaged in business in Nazi Germany. In a meeting with his uncle and father, the younger Kahn was given a choice: Stop speaking publicly, or resign. He chose the latter option.

After moving to New York, Kahn was the American Labor Party candidate in the 1948 elections for New York's 25th congressional district.

Anti-Nazi journalism
Almost immediately Kahn was offered a position as Executive Director of the newly formed American Council Against Nazi Propaganda.  Working for a Board of Directors including Helen Keller, Condé Nast, John Gunther, former Ambassador William E. Dodd, and German writer Thomas Mann, Kahn founded The Hour, a syndicated newsletter.  In that capacity he engaged in investigative journalism to expose Nazi espionage, sabotage, and propaganda operations in the United States. He also investigated the activities of American fascist and pro-fascist groups, such as the German-American Bund. The Hour's revelations were widely used in printed media, by radio commentators such as Walter Winchell, and by the US War Department, Justice Department, and the Office of War Information.

Books
Kahn used materials gained by his investigations of Nazi and German-American activities for The Hour as the basis of his first book, Sabotage! The Secret War Against America (1942), co-written with Michael Sayers. Reader's Digest printed excerpts from the book, and it became a bestseller.

Kahn and Sayers also collaborated on The Plot Against The Peace (1945) and The Great Conspiracy: The Secret War Against Soviet Russia (1946), which became an international bestseller. In the latter, which explored the Moscow purge trials, the authors accepted as valid the Communist Party charges of treason against former Soviet opposition leaders, and the underlying allegation of plots to overthrow the Soviet state, assassinate Lenin, Stalin, Gorky, and others. Most historians, by contrast, believe that these were show trials designed to suppress any opposition to Stalin; many of those convicted were summarily executed or exiled in the gulag.

Kahn was an outspoken opponent of the Cold War that arose between the United States (and its western allies) and the Soviet Union after World War II. With fears of communism increasing in the US, he was blacklisted by mainstream publishing, beginning in the late 1940s. Using pre-sales of books to leftist trade unions, he wrote and published High Treason: The Plot Against the People (Lear, 1950), a post-1917 political history of the United States; and The Game of Death: Effects of the Cold War on Our Children (C&K, 1953).

Cameron and Kahn
In the early 1950s, Kahn and Angus Cameron, an eminent Little, Brown editor who had recently been blacklisted, formed the publishing firm Cameron & Kahn.  In 1955 the firm published False Witness, the confession by Harvey Matusow, a former Communist and paid US government witness, that he had repeatedly lied under oath when testifying at House Un-American Activities Committee (HUAC) hearings.  These were being conducted to explore purported communist infiltration of government, Hollywood, and publishing. Matusow's confession caused a political sensation.

Pending publication of the book (whose contents had been publicized), the US government subpoenaed Kahn, Cameron and Matusow to appear before a federal grand jury.  The publishers were accused of bribing Matusow to falsely assert that he had committed perjury on behalf of the government.  After months of hearings and thousands of pages of testimony, the grand jury declined to issue indictments against Cameron or Kahn.

Simultaneously with these grand jury proceedings, Kahn, Cameron, and Matusow were subpoenaed to testify before the United States Senate Internal Security Subcommittee, chaired by James Eastland (D-Mississippi).  The purpose of the hearings was to determine whether publication of False Witness was the result of a Communist conspiracy to have Matusow lie in admitting perjury. The Senate committee did not assess the origin and consequences of Matusow's admitted perjury.

In the late 1950s Kahn wrote about the Matusow book and the aftermath of reaction to it. But his account was not published until eight years after his death, as The Matusow Affair: Memoir of a National Scandal (1987), by Moyer Bell. Angus Cameron wrote an introduction to the book.

Cameron and Kahn published books on a range of topics, including The Testament of Ethel and Julius Rosenberg, by the couple convicted and executed for espionage. They also published Seeds of Destruction; The Truth about the U.S. Occupation of Germany by Cedric Belfrage. They also published the novel The Ecstasy of Owen Muir by Ring Lardner.

Breaking the blacklist
During the 1950s, Kahn had his passport revoked for refusing to sign an affidavit newly required by the federal government, as to whether or not he was or had ever been a member of the Communist Party. This was related to continued activities of the House Un-American Activities Committee and a campaign of fear led by Senator Joseph McCarthy, R-Wisconsin,  claiming communist infiltration of government, publishing, and the entertainment industry. This requirement was ruled unconstitutional by the United States Supreme Court in a case involving Rockwell Kent, a noted painter and friend of Kahn.

Kahn finally broke the blacklist in 1962 when Simon & Schuster published his Days With Ulanova, an intimate portrait of the fabled Bolshoi Ballet ballerina, Galina Ulanova. Kahn received critical acclaim for this work.

On a trip to Moscow after Stalin's death, Kahn had met with Soviet leader Nikita Khrushchev in the Kremlin. He proposed that they collaborate on the Soviet leader's autobiography. Khrushchev agreed, but was forced from office before the project was launched.

Other books written by Kahn included Smetana and the Beetles (Random House, 1967), a satire of the defection of Stalin's daughter to the United States; Joys and Sorrows (Simon & Schuster, 1970), cellist Pablo Casals's memoir, as told to Kahn; and The Unholy Hymnal (Simon & Schuster, 1971), a satirical exposé of the Credibility Gap of the Nixon administration and others.

Personal life and death

In 1950, Kahn was serving as president of the Jewish People's Fraternal Order (JPFO), a member organization of the umbrella International Workers Order.  With IWO president Rockwell Kent, he attended a conference sponsored by the World Peace Council that resulted in a Stockholm Appeal, appealing for worldwide nuclear disarmament.

Kahn died on September 15, 1979, of a heart attack in Glen Ellen, California.

Bibliography
 Sabotage! The Secret War Against America (1942)
 The Plot Against the Peace: A Warning to the Nation! (1945)
 The Great Conspiracy: The Secret War Against Soviet Russia (1946)
 High Treason: The Plot Against the People (1950)
 The Game of Death: Effects of the Cold War on Our Children (1953)
 McCarthy on Trial (1954)
 Days With Ulanova: A Unique Pictorial Portrait of the Great Russian Ballerina (1962)
 Smetana and the Beetles: A Fairy Tale for Adults (1967)
 Joys and Sorrows: Pablo Casals, His Own Story as Told by Albert E. Kahn (1970)
 The Unholy Hymnal: Falsities and Delusions Rendered by President Richard M. Nixon [and Others] (1971)
 The Matusow Affair: Memoir of a National Scandal (1987, posthumous)

See also
 Michael Sayers
 Angus Cameron (publisher)
 Harvey Matusow

References

Further reading
 Arbunich, Marty. "Image that Moved Eichler/ Touching Image of Inspiration that Stirred Eichler's Soul -- Two Boys, Two Races, One Poignant Photograph", Eichler Network, 2018
 Bentley, Elizabeth. Deposition 30 November 1945, FBI file 65-14603. Also see Venona 247 KGB, San Francisco to Moscow, 14 June 1946, for an ambiguous mention of Kahn in the clear.
 Caballero, Raymond. McCarthyism vs. Clinton Jencks. Norman: University of Oklahoma Press, 2019.
 Haynes, John Earl and Harvey Klehr, Venona: Decoding Soviet Espionage in America, Yale University Press (1999).
 Kahn, Albert E. The Matusow Affair, Moyer Bell (1987).
 Kahn, Brian. My Father's Son, manuscript (2007).
 Sayers, Michael and Albert E. Kahn. Sabotage! The Secret War against America. Harper & Brothers Publishers, 1942

External links
 Albert E. Kahn papers archived at the Smithsonian Institution
 Sabotage outline
 An excerpt of the book Sabotage! The Secret War Against America by Michael Sayers & Albert E. Kahn
 The Great Conspiracy: The Secret War Against Soviet Russia
 The Game of Death: Effects of the Cold War on Our Children
 High Treason: The Plot Against the People
 Treason in Congress
 Plot Against The Peace
  NSA official VENONA site

1912 births
1979 deaths
American anti–Vietnam War activists
American communists
American male journalists
American people of German-Jewish descent
Journalists from the San Francisco Bay Area
Photographers from California
American political writers
American people in the Venona papers
American anti-fascists
Dartmouth College alumni
American investigative journalists
Jewish American journalists
Jewish American writers
Jewish socialists
Jewish anti-fascists
American Marxist journalists
Victims of McCarthyism
British emigrants to the United States
People from Glen Ellen, California
20th-century American writers
Activists from the San Francisco Bay Area
California socialists
New York (state) socialists
20th-century American journalists